George Henry Vanderbilt Cecil (February 27, 1925 – October 19, 2020) was an American businessman who was the owner and chairman of Biltmore Farms.

Biography
George was the first of two sons born to John Francis Amherst Cecil (1890–1954) and Cornelia Stuyvesant Vanderbilt (1900–1976) and was the grandson of George Washington Vanderbilt II, the founder of the Biltmore Estate. He was educated in Europe, attended the University of Edinburgh, and served in the Royal Navy during World War II. Upon the death of his mother, Cornelia Stuyvesant Vanderbilt, George was given the choice of taking over Biltmore Farms (the family dairy) or the Estate. Leaving the estate for his younger brother William Amherst Vanderbilt Cecil, George chose to take ownership of Biltmore Farms which, at the time, was much more profitable. Biltmore Farms had continued to grow under George's management, transforming it into a profitable real estate business that serves the Asheville area.

Personal life
Cecil was a direct descendant of both William Henry Vanderbilt and, on his father's side, William Cecil, the chief adviser to Queen Elizabeth I in the 16th century, through his grandparents, Lord William Cecil and Mary Rothes Margaret Cecil, Baroness Amherst of Hackney.

He married Nancy Owen Cecil and together they had six children: John ("Jack") F. A. V. Cecil, Edith Ann Cecil, Catherine Cecil Taylor, Margaret Cecil Sinnott, Louisa Cecil Harrison, and Christopher Cecil. His elder son, John F. A. V. Cecil, is currently the president of Biltmore Farms.

Cecil was born at Biltmore House in Asheville, North Carolina. He died in October 2020 at the age of 95. His wife Nancy predeceased him.

Ancestry

See also
 Biltmore Farms Biography
 Biltmore Estate History

References

1925 births
2020 deaths
20th-century American businesspeople
American people of Dutch descent
American people of English descent
George Henry Vanderbilt
George Henry Vanderbilt
Military personnel from North Carolina
People from Asheville, North Carolina
Royal Navy personnel of World War II
George Henry Vanderbilt
George Henry Vanderbilt